Guanylate cyclase 2C, also known as guanylyl cyclase C (GC-C), intestinal guanylate cyclase, guanylate cyclase-C receptor, or the heat-stable enterotoxin receptor (hSTAR) is an enzyme that in humans is encoded by the GUCY2C gene.

Guanylyl cyclase is an enzyme found in the luminal aspect of intestinal epithelium and dopamine neurons in the brain.  The receptor has an extracellular ligand-binding domain, a single transmembrane region, a region with sequence similar to that of protein kinases, and a C-terminal guanylate cyclase domain.  Tyrosine kinase activity mediates the GC-C signaling pathway within the cell.

Functions
GC-C is a key receptor for heat-stable enterotoxins that are responsible for acute secretory diarrhea.  Heat-stable enterotoxins are produced by pathogens such as Escherichia coli.  Knockout mice deficient in the GC-C gene do not show secretory diarrhea on infection with E. coli, though they do with cholera toxin.  This demonstrates the specificity of the GC-C receptor.

In medicine
Guanylate cyclase 2C is the target of linaclotide and plecanatide, oligopeptide agonists used for the treatment of chronic constipation.

References

Further reading

External links
GCC testing for colorectal cancer staging
GC-C knock-out mice
 

EC 4.6.1